Odalengo is the name of two places in the Province of Alessandria, Piedmont, Italy:
Odalengo Grande
Odalengo Piccolo